O'Higgins (SS-23) is a  built for the Chilean Navy by DCNS in Cherbourg and Navantia in Cartagena, Spain.

O'Higgins is the first of two units, ahead of  built to replace the old s that served in the Chilean Navy for 30 years. It is currently serving in the Submarine Force with a base port in Talcahuano.

References

Submarines of the Chilean Navy
Scorpène-class submarines
Scorpène-class submarines of the Chilean Navy